Palo Pinto may refer to various locations:

Palo Pinto, Missouri
Palo Pinto County, Texas - a county in northern Texas state.
Palo Pinto, Texas - county seat of and city in Palo Pinto County, Texas.
Palo Pinto Independent School District - public school district for the Palo Pinto area.